Emiliano Franco Terzaghi (born 6 March 1993) is an Argentine professional footballer who plays as a forward for USL League One club Richmond Kickers.

Career
Terzaghi played in his native Argentina from 2011, with spells at clubs including; Banfield, Temperley, Boca Unidos and Defensores de Belgrano.

Richmond Kickers

2020
On 24 January 2020, Terzaghi moved to the United States, signing with USL League One side Richmond Kickers. Terzaghi led the league in goals and was recognized as the 2020 USL League One MVP in his first season with Richmond.

On December 1, 2020, Terzaghi signed a contract extension keeping him in Richmond for the 2021 and 2022 seasons.

2021
Terzaghi once again led the league in goals with 18. On November 20, 2021, he was awarded a second consecutive USL League One MVP award for the 2021 season.

2022
For the third season in a row, Terzaghi led the league in goals with 17, helping the Kickers finish first in the regular season table. On November 4, 2022, he was awarded an unprecedented third consecutive USL League One MVP award for the 2022 season. On November 18, 2022, Richmond Kickers announced they re-signed Terzaghi to a multi-year deal.

Honors

Individual
USL League One MVP: 2020, 2021, 2022
USL League One Golden Boot: 2020, 2021, 2022
USL League One All-League First Team: 2020, 2021, 2022

Personal life
Terzaghi was born and raised in Buenos Aires. He is married and has one daughter.

References

External links
 
 

1993 births
Living people
Argentine footballers
Argentine expatriate footballers
Association football forwards
Club Atlético Banfield footballers
Club Atlético Temperley footballers
Boca Unidos footballers
Defensores de Belgrano footballers
San Martín de Burzaco footballers
Richmond Kickers players
Argentine Primera División players
Primera Nacional players
Torneo Argentino A players
Primera B Metropolitana players
Primera C Metropolitana players
USL League One players
Argentine expatriate sportspeople in the United States
Expatriate soccer players in the United States
Footballers from Buenos Aires